Jacó Roberto Hilgert (27 January 1926 – 17 December 2020) was a Brazilian Catholic bishop.

Hilgert was born in Brazil and was ordained to the priesthood in 1952. He served as bishop of the Diocese of Cruz Alta, Brazil, from 1976 to 2002.

Notes

1926 births
2020 deaths
20th-century Roman Catholic bishops in Brazil
Roman Catholic bishops of Cruz Alta